Carex turrita is a tussock-forming species of perennial sedge in the family Cyperaceae. It is native to parts of the Philippines and Papua New Guinea.

See also
List of Carex species

References

turrita
Plants described in 1904
Taxa named by Charles Baron Clarke
Flora of the Philippines
Flora of New Guinea